Justin Grant (born November 12, 1990) is an American racing driver from Ione, California. Grant is the 2020 USAC Silver Crown National Champion and the 2022 USAC National Sprint Car Champion.

Racing career

Midget Racing
Grant spent his early career racing midgets in California. At the age of 16, he was crowned the 2007 Bay Cities Racing Association (BCRA) Midget champion.

Chili Bowl
Grant was tapped to drive the #39BC for Clauson-Marshall Racing in the 2017 Chili Bowl. He won his preliminary qualifying night and started on the pole of the Saturday night feature, where he ultimately finished third behind Christopher Bell and Daryn Pittman.

In 2019, Grant started racing the RAMS Racing/Rockwell Security in the 4a Bullet by Spike/SR-11.  In his first Chili Bowl with the new team, Justin won his Friday night preliminary race.  On Saturday he started 5th, and finished 3rd behind, Christopher Bell and Kyle Larson.

Sprint Car racing

Grant moved to Indiana in 2009 at the age of 18, initially living and working in sprint car owner Jeff Walker's shop. In 2010, he was named USAC National Sprint Car Series Rookie of the Year, driving for car owner Kenny Baldwin. Over the next several years, he spent time driving for owners Walker, Baldwin, Mark Hery, Rick Pollock, Andrew Elson, Tony Epperson, and Steve & Carla Phillips.

At the tail end of the 2016 season, Grant joined Sam McGhee Motorsports and entered the most successful period of his USAC career, recording 18 top-five finishes in his first 21 USAC races with the team.

Silver Crown Racing
In 2017, Grant's car owner Chris Carli teamed up with Hemelgarn Racing in the USAC Silver Crown series. After becoming the first driver in USAC history to win the midget and sprint car openers in the same year, Grant had a chance to become the only driver to win the opener for all three series, but engine trouble in the Sumar Classic at the Terre Haute Action Track left that honor unclaimed.

Grant won 2020 USAC Silver Crown championship; he had no wins during the season.

Motorsports career results
(key)

USAC Sprint Car results

*Season still in progress

USAC Midget results

*Season still in progress

USAC Silver Crown results

*Season still in progress

Chili Bowl results

References

1990 births
Living people
American racing drivers
Racing drivers from California
People from Amador County, California
USAC Silver Crown Series drivers